Caproxamine is a drug which was patented as an antidepressant.

References 

Amines
Antidepressants
Ketoximes
Anilines